JVI may refer to:
 Central Jersey Regional Airport, in Somerset County, New Jersey, United States
 Journal of Value Inquiry
 Journal of Virology
 Jack Van Impe